Miss Mayotte is a French beauty pageant which selects a representative for the Miss France national competition from the overseas region of Mayotte. The competition was first held in 2000. 

The current Miss Mayotte is Anna Ousseni, who was crowned Miss Mayotte 2021 on 6 October 2021. No Miss Mayotte titleholders have gone on to win Miss France.

Results summary
3rd Runner-Up: Esthel Née (2008)
Top 12/Top 15: Maïté Boudy (2002); Élodie-Méryl Anridhoini (2010); Anlia Charifa (2020)

Titleholders

Notes

References

External links

Miss France regional pageants
Beauty pageants in France
Women in Mayotte